Scarface is a role-playing iOS game developed by Canadian studio Fuse Powered Inc. and released on April 26, 2012.

Critical reception
The game has a rating of 38% on Metacritic based on 4 critic reviews.

Slidetoplay said "Scarface is a movie-themed Mafia Wars with less to do and more profanity." Gamezebo wrote "Scarface for iOS has the foundation of a solid social adventure, but it doesn't expand on its component parts in any interesting ways. The lines of dialogue might be enough to draw fans in initially, but pedestrian gameplay will do precious little to keep them coming back for more." 148apps said "There's a fantastic license within but Scarface is really very disappointing and gangster fans won't be impressed at all." Modojo wrote "In tribute, execution, design and characterization, Scarface is nothing less than a dreadful game: a mindless skinner-box that doesn't even offer up enough temptation to make you want to take another peck at it. The score it achieves reflects only that the game does what it does without breaking itself in the process."

References

2012 video games
Android (operating system) games
IOS games
Organized crime video games
Role-playing video games
Video games about the illegal drug trade
Video games based on films
Video games based on adaptations
Video games developed in Canada
Video games set in Miami